Åby Stora Pris (literally "Åby Grand Prize") is an annual Group One harness event for trotters that is held at Åby Racetrack in Mölndal, 10 km south of Gothenburg, Sweden. Åby Stora Pris has taken place since 1936, the same year Åby Racetrack was opened. In 2008, the purse of the event was approximately US$359,000 (SEK2,400,000). Åby Stora Pris is part of the European Grand Circuit.

Racing conditions
Through the years, the conditions of the event have varied. Before 2005, the winner was decided through a single race. This one race had since 1978 been of 2,140 meters. As from 2005, when the setup was changed, the same eight horses have been racing each other in two 1,640 meter-heats. These heats are followed by a race-off of 1,640 meters, if necessary, i.e. if the two heats are won by different horses.

With the exception of 1981, a motorized starting gate has been used to launch the race since 1979.

In 1978, when the distance was decreased to 2,140 meters, another shift was made as well. Date wise, the event had been held in May or June until then. After the change in 1978, it has been held in September, apart from the years 1990-92 when the race was in August.

The event is invitational, meaning only invited horses can participate. To come in contention for invitations, a horse must be of age four or above.

Past winners

Horses with most wins
 2 - Sebastian K. (2012, 2013)
 2 - Gidde Palema (2003, 2005)
 2 - Victory Tilly (2000, 2002)
 2 - Zoogin (1995, 1996)
 2 - Idéal du Gazeau (1981, 1982)
 2 - Lyon (1970, 1972)
 2 - Gelinotte (1956, 1957) 
 2 - Iran Scott (1951, 1952)

Sires with at least two winning offsprings
 3 - Scotland (Scotch Thistle, Scotch Fez, Locomotive)
 3 - Bulwark (Frances Bulwark, Optimist, Justus)
 2 - Quick Pay (Victory Tilly, The Onion)
 2 - Kairos (Gelinotte, Hairos II)
 2 - Hermes D. (Pluvier III, Orlof)
 2 - Hollyrood Harkaway (Trumps, Escape)

Mares with at least two winning offsprings
 2 - My Sister Lou (Big Noon, Exklusiv)

Drivers with most wins
 6 - Åke Svanstedt
 5 - Stig H. Johansson 
 4 - Gösta Nordin
 3 - Sören Nordin
 3 - Ragnar Thorngren
 3 - Jorma Kontio

Other note
Frances Bulwark is the only mare that have won the event herself (in 1950) in addition to having bred a winner, the stallion Frances Nibs, who won in 1964. Frances Nibs has also sired a winner, the champion of 1977, Micko Tilly. Thus this line represents winners in three generations.

All winners of Åby Stora Pris

See also
 List of Scandinavian harness horse races

References

External links
 Official website (Swedish)

Harness races in Sweden